Puinahua District is one of eleven districts in the province of Requena in Peru.

References

Districts of the Requena Province
Districts of the Loreto Region